Lee Soo-Gil (born 9 April 1979) is a South Korean retired footballer who lastly plays for Suwon FC in K League Challenge.

Career
He joined Pohang Steelers in 2002 but made no appearance in the team.

He moved to Suwon FC in 2003. He made his professional return on 16 March 2013 after Suwon FC participated in K League Challenge from the semi-professional league Korea National League.

References

External links 

1979 births
Living people
Association football defenders
South Korean footballers
Pohang Steelers players
Suwon FC players
Korea National League players
K League 1 players
K League 2 players